Commander Joseph Groves Boxhall RD, RNR (23 March 1884 – 25 April 1967) was the fourth officer on the , and later served as a naval officer in World War I. Boxhall was the last surviving former officer of the Titanic.

Early life
Boxhall was born in Hull in the East Riding of Yorkshire, England, the second child of Miriam and Captain Joseph Boxhall. He was born into an established seafaring tradition: His grandfather had been a mariner, his uncle was a Trinity House buoymaster and Board of Trade official, and his father was a respected master with the Wilson Line of Hull.

Boxhall followed in the footsteps of his ancestors on 2 June 1899, when he joined his first ship, a barque of the William Thomas Line of Liverpool. Boxhall's apprenticeship lasted four years, during which time he travelled extensively. He then went to work with his father at Wilson Line and, after obtaining his Master's and Extra-Master's certifications in September 1907, joined the White Star Line. On 1 October 1911, he was confirmed as a sub-lieutenant in the Royal Naval Reserve. He served on White Star's liners  and Arabic before moving to the Titanic as Fourth Officer in 1912; he was then 28 years old.

RMS Titanic
Like the ship's other junior officers, Boxhall reported to White Star's Liverpool offices at nine o'clock in the morning on 26 March 1912, and travelled to board the ship at Belfast the following day. After the RMS Titanic departed Southampton on 10 April, Boxhall settled into his regular duties; these included scheduled watches, aiding in navigation, and assisting passengers and crew when necessary.

When Titanic collided with an iceberg at 11:40 pm on 14 April, Officer Boxhall was on duty but was not on the bridge. At the two inquiries held into the sinking in 1912 he stated he was standing on the Boat Deck just outside the officers' quarters. In his 1962 BBC interview he said he was in his cabin, having gone there to make tea. Hearing the lookout bell, he headed immediately to the bridge, arriving just after the impact. Capt. Smith, who had also just arrived on the bridge, ordered Boxhall to perform an inspection of the forward part of the ship. He found no damage, but was later intercepted by the ship's carpenter, who informed him that the ship was taking water. A mail clerk confirmed this to Boxhall and Captain Smith. Later, it was Boxhall who calculated the Titanics position so that a distress signal could be sent out. It was also Boxhall who sighted the masthead lights of a nearby vessel (possibly the ) and attempted in vain to signal by Morse lamp and distress flares.

Officer Boxhall was placed in charge of lifeboat No. 2, which was lowered from the port side at 1.45 am with 18 persons aboard out of a possible 40. He rowed away from the ship for fear of being pulled down by suction. Boxhall did not actually see the Titanic founder, as her lights had gone out and his lifeboat was about  distant. After being collected by the Carpathia, Boxhall and the other survivors arrived at Pier 54 in New York on 18 April.

While in New York, he served as a witness in the American inquiry into the sinking. He and his fellow surviving officers were allowed to leave New York on the Adriatic on 2 May. After returning to England, Boxhall bore witness again, this time at the British inquiry. Much of his testimony concerned details of the lifeboat lowerings and Titanics navigation, including the many ice warnings. He was also the first person to testify that he saw another vessel in proximity while Titanic sank.

Later years and death
Following the Titanic disaster, Boxhall briefly served as Fourth Officer on White Star's Adriatic. He was promoted to lieutenant in the RNR on 27 May 1915. During the First World War, he was commissioned to serve for one year aboard the battleship  before being dispatched to Gibraltar, where he commanded a torpedo boat.

Boxhall returned to White Star following the war in May 1919, having married Marjory Beddells two months prior. On 27 May 1923, he was promoted to lieutenant-commander in the RNR. He signed on as second officer on board  the lead ship of the three Olympic-class vessels which Titanic was the second ship constructed on 30 June 1926. (The White Star line never promoted any of the surviving Titanic officers to command rank.)

After 41 years at sea, he retired in 1940. Boxhall was a generally taciturn and quiet man, usually reluctant to speak about his experiences on the Titanic. However, in 1957, he acted as a technical advisor for the film adaptation of Walter Lord's documentary-style novel, A Night to Remember, and also gave a BBC interview in 1962.

His health deteriorated rapidly in the 1960s, and he was eventually hospitalised. The last surviving deck officer of Titanic, Boxhall died of a cerebral thrombosis on 25 April 1967 at the age of 83.

He is commemorated with a green plaque on The Avenues, Kingston upon Hull.

Portrayals
Jack Watling (1958) (A Night to Remember) Boxhall himself acted as a technical consultant to the film's writers and set designers.
Warren Clarke (1979) (S.O.S. Titanic) (TV movie)
Gerard Plunkett (1996) (Titanic) (TV miniseries) Boxhall is inaccurately portrayed as going down with the ship (due to his character being merged with that of Sixth Officer James Moody.)
Simon Crane (1997) (Titanic) Boxhall appears in scenes such as on the bridge and being ordered by Captain Smith to put the ship's engines to a stop following the collision. He's also in charge of firing the flares and lifeboat No. 2. Boxhall only has two lines which occurs in the scenes: "Aye-aye, sir!" on the bridge and "Bloody pull faster and pull!" when he orders lifeboat No. 2 to row away from the Titanic's stern, which rises dangerously behind him.
Glen McDougal (1998) (Titanic: Secrets Revealed) (TV documentary)
Emmett James (1999) (The Titanic Chronicles) (TV documentary; voice only)
Cian Barry (2012) (Titanic) (TV miniseries)

References

Titanic-Titanic
Encyclopedia Titanica
US Senate Inquiry

External links

1884 births
1967 deaths
Military personnel from Kingston upon Hull
Royal Navy officers of World War I
Deaths from cerebral thrombosis
Seamen from Kingston upon Hull
British Merchant Navy officers
RMS Titanic survivors
Royal Naval Reserve personnel
Burials at sea